Bolitophila saundersii  is a Palearctic species of  'fungus gnat' in the family Bolitophilidae.
The larvae of Bolitophila are mycetophagous and live in decaying wood or other organic debris overgrown by fungal plant substrates. The name honours William Wilson Saunders.

References

Bolitophilidae